Bellevue is a rural locality in the Shire of Mareeba, Queensland, Australia. In the  Bellevue had a population of 0 people.

History
Bellevue Provisional School opened in 1898 as a half-time school with Springbank Provisional School (meaning they shared a single teacher). It closed circa 1900.

Between 2008 and 2013, Bellevue (along with all other parts of the Shire of Mareeba) was within the Tablelands Region.

In the  Bellevue had a population of 0 people.

Geography
The Mitchell River forms the northern boundary.

Road infrastructure
The Burke Developmental Road (State Route 27) passes through the south-west corner.

Heritage listings 
Bellevue has a number of heritage-listed sites, including:
 Kitoba Holding: OK Mine & Smelter

References

Shire of Mareeba
Localities in Queensland